Bréel is a commune in the Orne department in northwestern France. On 1 January 2016, it was merged into the new commune of Athis-Val-de-Rouvre.

Population

See also
 Communes of the Orne department

References

Former communes of Orne